Yes or No  or Yes/No may refer to:
 Yes and no in English
 Yes–no question, a form of question which can normally be answered using a simple "yes" or "no"

Film and TV
 Yes or No?, a 1920 silent film
 Yes or No (film), a 2010 Thai romantic film
 Yes or No (game show), a version of Deal or No Deal airing in South Korea
 Yes or No (TV series), (யெஸ் ஆர் நோ) a Tamil-language talent game show in India
"Yes/No" (Glee)", an episode of Glee
"Yes or No, Tsunade's answer" ("YESかNOか!ツナデの回答"), a season four episode of the anime series Naruto (see list of Naruto episodes)

Music

Albums
Yes/No, a 2012 EP by Fake Blood
Yes, No (T-Square album), 1988

Songs
"Yes/No" (Banky W. song), 2012
 "Yes or No" (song), by The Go-Go's
"Yes or No" by Wayne Shorter from the 1965 album JuJu
"Yes or No", song by Tommy Seebach

Other uses
 "Yes" or "No" the Guide to Better Decisions a book by Spencer Johnson

See also
 Yes and no (disambiguation)